Telupe Iosefa (born 1 November 1986, in Nukulaelae) is a Tuvaluan powerlifter. In 2015 Telupe Iosefa received the first ever gold medal won by Tuvalu at the Pacific Games in the powerlifting 120 kg male division.

Career
The Tuvalu Weightlifting Federation staged its first national competition on 2 July 2013 as part of the 2013 Tuvalu Games. Telupe Iosefa won the 105 kg male division.

At the 2013 Commonwealth Men's Powerlifting Championships in Auckland, New Zealand, Iosefa won the silver medal in the 105 kg male division with a total of 647.5 kg. 
 
In 2014 he achieved the best performance in the squat lift with 316 kg in the 120 kg male division at the Oceania Powerlifting Federation event on 14 December 2014 at Melbourne, Australia.

In the powerlifting competition at the 2015 Pacific Games, Telupe Iosefa competed in the 120 kg male division. He achieved a squat lift of 337.5 kg (the best performance), he then produced a bench press of 182.5 kg, followed by a deadlift of 285 kg to achieve the total of 805 kg to win the gold medal in his division. This was an Oceania/Commonwealth Powerlifting Federation record.

At the Asia & Oceania Classic Men's Powerlifting Championships 2016, in Christchurch (New Zealand), in December 2016, Telupe Iosefa competed in the 120 kg male division. He achieved a squat lift of 351.0 kg (the best performance), he then produced a bench press of 190.0 kg, followed by a deadlift of 310.0 kg to achieve the total of 851.0 kg to win the gold medal in his division.

Telupe Iosefa competed in the 120 kg division at the 2017 Asia & Oceania Championships held in Singapore and the 2018 Asia & Oceania Championships held in Brisbane, Australia.

Telupe Iosefa received a silver medal in the powerlifting 120 kg male division at the 2019 Pacific Games held in Apia, Samoa.

Achievements 
Powerlifting

References 

1986 births
Living people
People from Nukulaelae
Tuvaluan male weightlifters